is a railway station on the Iida Line in the town of Takamori, Shimoina District, Nagano Prefecture, Japan operated by Central Japan Railway Company (JR Central).

Lines
Ichida Station is served by the Iida Line and is 136.8 kilometers from the starting point of the line at Toyohashi Station.

Station layout
The station consists of a two ground-level opposed side platforms connected by a level crossing. The station is staffed.

Platforms

Adjacent stations

History
Ichida Station opened on 13 March 1923. A new station building was completed in February 1969. With the privatization of Japanese National Railways (JNR) on 1 April 1987, the station came under the control of JR Central. A new station building was completed in February 2009.

Passenger statistics
In fiscal 2016, the station was used by an average of 418 passengers daily (boarding passengers only).

Surrounding area
 Tenryū River

See also
 List of railway stations in Japan

References

External links

 Ichida Station information 

Railway stations in Nagano Prefecture
Railway stations in Japan opened in 1923
Stations of Central Japan Railway Company
Iida Line
Takamori, Nagano